The Wāli of Swat was the official title of the leader (wāli) of the erstwhile princely state of Swat and also the nomenclature of the Miangul dynasty that ruled there from 1926 to 1969.

History
The earlier titles of the rulers of Swat were Yousufzai Amir-e Shariyat, and Akhund. On the death of Saidu Baba, Akhund of Swat, in 1878, the state fell into abeyance until 1915, when Syed Abdul Jabbar Shah gained power, with the title of Badshah. This title was changed to "Wali" in 1926, when Swat became a princely state in a subsidiary alliance with the British Indian Empire.

Upon Pakistan's independence in August 1947, Swat became a fully independent princely state until 3 November, when it acceded to Pakistan as one of the autonomous Princely states of Pakistan, and the Wali continued to rule. The Wali ceased to rule in 1969, when the state of Swat was incorporated into the North-West Frontier Province of Pakistan (now Khyber Pakhtunkhwa). The region comprising the former princely state today covers parts of the Swat, Buner and Shangla districts of Khyber Pakhtunkhwa. Today, the title is used unofficially as a courtesy title by heirs of the Miangul family of the former Wali of Swat. The whole dynasty founded by the Abdul Wadud Badshah, also called itself by this title. The Wāli of Swat, Miangul Abdul Wadud, acceded his state to Pakistan on 3 November 1947. The last Wali, Miangul Jahan Zeb (1908 to 1987) continued to exercise absolute rule until Pakistan took control, when on 28 July 1969, Yahya Khan announced the full integration of Swat, Chitral, and Dir into Pakistan.

Rulers of Swat

Miangul Jahanzeb 

Miangul Jahanzeb (1908–1987) was the last Wali of Swat and who was popular for promoting education in the region. He served as the Wāli of Swat between 1949 and 1969, taking over from his father, Miangul Abdul Wadud. He is remembered for the hard work he put into building schools, hospitals and roads for his people, but also for his absolute rule over the region, which ended when Pakistan took control after local unrest.

Miangul Jahanzeb was born at Saidu-Sharif, on 5 June 1908. He was the eldest son of Miangul Abdul Wadud, who preceded him as the Wali of Swat. Jahanzeb was educated in Islamia Collegiate school and the Islamia College University of Peshawar, 1923. He had four son as well as one daughter, Ayesha Salam

Miangul Jahanzeb was appointed as successor (Wali Ahad) in 1933. His father, Miangul Abdul Wadud (Wali of Swat) abdicated in favour of his eldest son (Miangul Jahanzeb), whom he had carefully educated along modern lines, and gradually trained up to assume the full burdens of government. He was enthroned as Wali of Swat on 12 June 1949 and granted the title of Ghazi-e-Millat (1951) and a hereditary salute.

The Wali headed each department of his administration. His role was that of king and religious leader, chief minister and commander-in-chief, chief exchequer and head qazi. He inspected every construction project personally and did not compromise on quality, which is partly why the buildings of the Swat are still in excellent condition and admired by the people. He ensured that his government provided good administration and productive revenue collection and a judicial system that provided quick and free justice to all.  This was a unique system of administration.

He surpassed the other contemporary rulers in the field of education. Schools and colleges were built across the State.

Jahan Zeb was also a conscientious protector of the landmarks of previous cultures. In the era of the last Wali of Swat State Miangul Abdul Haq Jahanzeb, the ruins were protected and preserved.

Foreign Heads of State and VIPs became regular visitors to the valley, and the Wali became a frequent player on the national stage. In 1961 the Queen of the United Kingdom, as a guest of the Wali, loved Swat and called it "The Switzerland of the East". The first Prime Minister of Pakistan Liaqat Ali Khan also visited Swat to attend the coronation ceremony of the Wali.

The last Wali of Swat died on 14 September 1987 at Saidu Sharif. Swat is now part of Khyber Pakhtunkhwa.

References

 
 Last ruler of Swat: Jahanzeb, a visionary who educated and loved his people
 Swat's Gandhara heritage waits to be protected

Further reading
 Dr. Sultan-I-Rome, Swat State under the Walis (1917–69), Ph.D. Dissertation, P 28-35
 Miangul Jehanzeb, The Last Wali of Swat, as told to Fredrik Barth. Norwegian University Press/Universitetsforlaget AS, Oslo, 1985

Titles of national or ethnic leadership
Princely rulers of Pakistan
Nawabs of Pakistan
Pashtun politics
Swat District
Swat royal family
1987 deaths
Year of birth missing